The CP1600 is a 16-bit microprocessor created in a partnership between General Instrument and Honeywell, introduced in February 1975. It is one of the first single-chip 16-bit processors. The overall design bore a strong resemblance to the PDP-11.

Honeywell used the CP1600 in a number of process control computers and related systems, but its most widespread use was the CP1610 version in the Intellivision video game console. The system saw little other use due to General Instrument's marketing philosophy of seeking out customers only with very large orders and ignoring smaller customers. They also did not pursue  a second source arrangement, which in the early days of microprocessor designs was a requirement for most potential customers.

Description

Physical implementation

The CP1600 was implemented in enhancement mode nMOS and required +12, +5, -3 V power supplies; I/O connections except for the clocks were TTL (5 V) compatible. Each microstate or processor cycle uses four internal time slots generated by two non-overlapping clocks. A 3.3 MHz two-phase clock produces a 600 nanosecond microcycle. A 5 MHz two-phase clock produces a 400 nanosecond microcycle. Due to the voltage requirements of the clock signals, these had to be generated with external circuitry, as was common in this era of microprocessor design.

In order to fit a 16-bit processor into a 40-pin dual in-line package (DIP) chip design, the CP1600 multiplexed its data and address pins. This allowed a set of 16 pins to be used for both address selection and reading and writing data, but to do so required two bus cycles. It also complicated the overall machine layout as buffers were required on the memory bus to latch the address while the processor switched the pins to data mode.

A relatively uncommon feature of the CP1600 was its "external branch" concept. This was implemented as four pins on the chip,  through , which held the lower four bits of the  instruction opcode. When this instruction is performed, the pins are activated and are used to indicate which of up to sixteen external systems should be sampled. Those devices would then respond to the query by setting  pin, and the state of this pin would then determine whether the branch was taken or not.

This contrasts with the typical solution for handling external devices; most systems have the devices raise an interrupt which causes the processor to call special code, the interrupt handler, which then reads additional data to determine which device called the interrupt. This additional data may be presented using dedicated pins on the CPU, but is often presented as a value on the data bus. The interrupt handler code then decides which device driver to call to process the data.

In total, implementing a system using the CP1600 often required additional support chips and logic. This included a system to multiplex sixteen signals into a single pin if the external branching was being used, and a three-bit-to-eight-line converter to avoid having to decode the bus status signals in external parts.

Instruction set and registers

Of the 16-bits available in an instruction opcode, the CP1600 used only 10. The remaining 6 bits were marked "Future Use." Although the unused bits reduced the code density, special 10-bit wide ROMs were created by General Instrument for embedded systems. Additionally there was a SDBD instruction that pieced together a 16-bit argument from two 10-bit ROM reads.

It appears that the unused 6 bits were intended to be used with co-processors, asserting the PCIT line which stalled the CPU until released. Early documentation shows two planned chips in the series, the 1616 which added the "Extended Instruction Set", and the 1618 "Priority Expander".

The system included 87 basic instructions. Instructions might be one to three 16-bit words long depending on the addressing format being used. The CP1600 did not support memory-memory indirect addressing (offsets), and looping was implemented using a dedicated adder that performed single-cycle changes to addresses in memory. The arithmetic logic unit (ALU) was 16-bit wide and could add two 16-bit internal registers in 2.4 microseconds, and memory to register add two 16-bit numbers in 3.2 microseconds.

Like the PDP-11, the CP1600 used eight 16-bit "general purpose" processor registers, although they were not truly general-purpose as in modern designs. Only R0 had no pre-defined purpose and has been described as "the primary accumulator". R1 through R3 could be used data pointers, generally used for register-based addressing ("implied addressing"). R4 and R5 auto-incremented after being accessed, which made them useful for looping over collections of data.

R6 was the stack pointer, R7 the program counter. Since both of these registers were visible to the programmer, they could be used to implement multiple stacks, or support more complex branching, among other things. There were no implicit stack instructions; when R6 was used in a "read" operation it decremented the address and then returned the data being pointed at, simulating a POP, and when it was used in a "write" it would write then post-increment (like R4/R5), simulating a PUSH.

I/O
As was common for the era, the CP1600 used memory-mapped I/O, as opposed to separate I/O pins as seen on the Intel systems. The use of a multiplexed bus and multi-state bus status made implementing I/O more difficult than would normally be the case on memory-mapped systems. This meant that implementations had to use latches or buffers to be able to interface with the CPU as it changed the bus from indicating an address to data. This both negatively affected I/O performance and increased the complexity of the I/O devices.

To address this problem, GI supplied a series of 164x dedicated I/O chips that implemented the required bus logic. These included, for instance, the 1641 keyboard controller, the 1643 cassette tape controller, and the 1647 display control. Most famous among these is the 1640 "Programmable Interface Controller", or PIC, which was designed to work in concert with the CP1600 and act as a channel controller for the CPU. As with the other 1640 series chips, the PIC internally decoded the bus logic, but also added a very simple processor that could run its own programs to perform I/O and direct memory access. For instance, one might send an instruction to a PIC on a floppy disk card to read data from a given sector on the disk. The PIC would then read the data into its own internal buffer, watch the bus for unused time when the bus status pins were all zero, and then send data to main memory.

General Instrument provided cross-assemblers and simulators/debuggers compatible with 16-bit or larger minicomputers. GI also provided a standalone CP1600 based microcomputer system in the GIC1600.

Uses
The CP1610, used in game consoles such as the Champion 2711 and most notably the Intellivision, is a compatible member of the 1600 microprocessor family. It uses a 2 MHz two-phase clock producing a 1 microsecond processor cycle. The CP1610 in the NTSC Intellivisions uses a 1.7897725 MHz two-phase clock.  Although users of the CP1600 in the traditional computer role were relatively rare, over 3 million Intellivisions were produced from 1980 until the video game crash of 1983 led to the closing of the Intellivision production lines in 1984.

Production of the CP1600 ended in 1985 when General Instrument spun off its microelectronics division to create Microchip Technology. By this point a number of 32-bit designs like the MC68000 were available that limited interest in a 16-bit design like the CP1600, and their main existing customer, the Intellivision, was no longer in production. Many other products were also end-of-lifed at the same time, and their primary product was the PIC.

Notes

References

Citations

Bibliography

External links
 "CP1610" at the Intellivision Wiki

Honeywell
Intellivision
16-bit microprocessors